The Fiat Oggi (named after "today" in Italian) is a two-door sedan based on the Fiat 147, a subcompact car produced in South America by Italian automaker Fiat. The Oggi was produced in Brazil from 1983 until 1985, when it was replaced by the Uno-based Prêmio. This car was a response to the new sedans in the Brazilian market, the Chevrolet Monza, the Volkswagen Voyage and later the Ford Escort.

The Oggi featured a very big trunk for a car only 3,966 mm (156 in) long. According to Quatro Rodas magazine of 05/1983 the volume of the trunk was 440 liters, the second largest in Brazil. The biggest was the Monza's: 448 liters, but the Monza was a mid-size car with an overall length of 4,366 mm (172 in).

The Oggi was mainly sold with one engine option, the 1.3 L (1,297 cc) Fiat 124 series engine, equipped to run on either alcohol or gasoline. The CS version was added in January 1984. In 1984 and 1985 there was also a special version named CSS with a 1.4 L (1,415 cc) engine. This was also used in a Brazilian race championship and was limited to about 300 units sold. Overall, 20,419 Oggis were sold in Brazil over its three-year career.

References

External links

Fiat Oggi CS

Oggi
Cars of Brazil
Subcompact cars
Front-wheel-drive vehicles
Cars introduced in 1983
Cars discontinued in 1985